Nicolò Verzeni (born 6 February 2002) is an Italian footballer who plays as a right-back for  club Pergolettese.

Club career
Verzeni made his senior debut for Brescia on 28 October 2020 in a Coppa Italia game against Perugia. He made his Serie B debut on 8 December 2020, starting in a game against Cremonese.

On 21 December 2020 he signed his first professional contract with Brescia.

On 14 July 2021, he joined Serie C club Pergolettese.

References

External links
 

Living people
2002 births
People from Clusone
Sportspeople from the Province of Bergamo
Italian footballers
Footballers from Lombardy
Association football fullbacks
Serie B players
Serie C players
Brescia Calcio players
U.S. Pergolettese 1932 players